Andean tyrant has been split into 2 species:

Jelski's black tyrant, Knipolegus signatus
Plumbeous tyrant, Knipolegus cabanisi

Birds by common name